Minuscule 118 (in the Gregory-Aland numbering), ε 346 (Soden), is a Greek minuscule manuscript of the New Testament, on parchment leaves. Paleographically it has been assigned to the 13th-century. It has complex contents with some marginalia.

Description 

The codex contains almost complete text of the four Gospels on 256 parchment leaves (size ), with the average dimensions of the text . Some texts were defects and were supplied in the 15th century on six paper leaves by later hands with texts of Matthew 1:1-6:2; Luke 13:15-14:20, 18:8-19:9, John 16:25-end.

There is a division according to the Ammonian Sections (in Mark 234, 16:9) but added by later hand, with references to Eusebian Canons.

Synaxaria and Menologion were added by a later hand.

The codex contains supplementary leaves in Matthew, Luke, and John. The supplementary leaves of Luke 13:35-14:20 and 18:8-29 are palimpsest on parchment, the underwriting contains the Psalms.

The hand is not neat, but readable.

Text 

The Greek text of the codex is a representative of the Caesarean text-type. It belongs to the textual Family 1. Aland placed it in Category III. As a member of the f1 has a close affinity to the codices 205 and 209. They together constitute a sub-group within this family. According to the Claremont Profile Method 118 is a core of Family 1.

History 

C. R. Gregory dated it to the 13th-century. Currently it is dated by the INTF to the 13th-century.

The manuscript was donated by Narcissus March († 1713), Archbishop of Armagh, to the Bodleian Library.

It was well collated by Griesbach. According to Griesbach the text of this manuscript is a representative of the Alexandrian textual recension. C. R. Gregory saw it in 1883.

The manuscript was examined by Kirsopp Lake.

It is currently housed at the Bodleian Library (MS. Auct. D. inf. 2.17), at Oxford.

See also 

 List of New Testament minuscules
 Biblical manuscript
 Textual criticism
 Family 1

References

Further reading 

 J. J. Griesbach, Symbolae critique, I, 8, CCII-CCXXIII.
 Kirsopp Lake, Codex 1 of the Gospels and its Allies, Texts and Studies VII 3 (Cambridge, 1902).

External links 

 Minuscule 118 at the Encyclopedia of Textual Criticism
 Online images of minuscule 118 (Digital Microfilm) at the CSNTM.

Greek New Testament minuscules
13th-century biblical manuscripts
Bodleian Library collection